The greater Brisbane area of Queensland Australia, has many species of indigenous flora. This article links the flora to its geography with:
a list of indigenous genera and species with common names and reference links
a list of places you might see the plants around Brisbane, in parks and in the wild
reference resources

Plants
The list is organised in alphabetic order by genera; then species scientific name and common names; then external links documenting that species.

A

Acacia, wattles
Acacia fimbriata, Brisbane golden wattle
Acacia leiocalyx, black wattle
Acmena, lillypilly
Acmena smithii, lillypilly
Acronychia, aspens
Acronychia laevis, glossy acronychia
Acronychia pauciflora, soft acronychia
Adiantum
Adiantum aethiopicum, common maidenhair fern
Adiantum hispidulum, rough maidenhair fern
Ailanthus
Ailanthus triphysa, white bean
Alchornea
Alchornea ilicifolia, native holly
Alectryon
Alectryon tomentosus, hairy alectryon
Alocasia
Alocasia brisbanensis, cunjevoi
Alphitonia
Alphitonia excelsa, red ash
Alpinia
Alpinia caerulea, native ginger
Alyxia
Alyxia ruscifolia, chain fruit
Angophora, apples, gums
Angophora subvelutina, broadleaf apple
Angophora leiocarpa, rusty gum
Aphananthe
Aphananthe philippinensis, axe handle wood
Allocasuarina, forest she-oaks
Allocasuarina torulosa, forest she-oak
Araucaria, conifers, pines
Araucaria bidwillii, bunya pine
Araucaria cunninghamii, Moreton Bay pine, hoop pine
Argyrodendron
Argyrodendron trifoliolatum, white booyong
Aristolochia
Aristolochia praevenosa, Richmond birdwing butterfly vine
Arytera
Arytera divaricata, coogera
Asplenium
Asplenium australasicum, birdsnest fern
Austromyrtus
Austromyrtus bidwillii, python tree
Austromyrtus hillii, scaly myrtle
Austromyrtus acmenoides, scrub ironwood
Austrosteenisia
Austrosteenisia blackii, blood vine

B
Baloghia
Baloghia inophylla, scrub bloodwood

Banksia
Banksia integrifolia, coastal banksia
Brachychiton, kurrajong, bottletree
Brachychiton discolor, lacebark
Brachychiton populneus, kurrajong.
See http://www.anbg.gov.au/gnp/interns-2002/brachychiton-populneus.html
Bridelia
Bridelia exaltata, brush ironbark
Bridelia leichhardtii, small-leaved brush ironbark

C

Callistemon, bottlebrush
Callistemon salignus, white bottlebrush
Callistemon viminalis, weeping bottlebrush
Capparis
Capparis arborea, brush caper berry
Carissa
Carissa ovata, current bush
See https://web.archive.org/web/20060822095802/http://www.brisrain.webcentral.com.au/old_site/database/Cari_ovata.htm
Cassine
Cassine australis, red olive plum
Castanospermum
Castanospermum australe, black bean
Casuarina, she-oaks
Casuarina cunninghamiana, river she-oak
Cissus
Cissus antarctica, water vine
Cissus opaca, small-leaf water vine
Citriobatus
Citriobatus pauciflorus, orange thorn
Citriobatus linearis, bird's nest bush
Citrus
Citrus australasica previously Microcitrus australasica, finger lime
 See https://web.archive.org/web/20070720000320/http://www.brisrain.webcentral.com.au/01_cms/details_pop.asp?ID=565
Citrus australis previously Microcitrus australis, native lime
 See https://web.archive.org/web/20060819084722/http://www.brisrain.webcentral.com.au/01_cms/details_pop.asp?ID=72
Clerodendrum
Clerodendrum floribundum, lollybush
Commersonia
Commersonia bartramia, brown kurrajong
Corchorus
Corchorus cunninghamii, native jute
Cordyline
Cordyline petiolaris, broad-leaved palm lily
Cordyline rubra, red-fruited palm lily
Crinum
Crinum pedunculatum, river lily
Cryptocarya
Cryptocarya obovata, pepperberry tree
Corymbia, bloodwoods, ghost gums, spotted gums
Corymbia citriodora, lemon scented gum, spotted gum (Eucalyptus citriodora)
See http://www.saveourwaterwaysnow.com.au/01_cms/details_pop.asp?ID=135 
 See http://plantnet.rbgsyd.nsw.gov.au/cgi-bin/euctax.pl?/PlantNet/Euc=&name=Corymbia+citriodora 
Corymbia henryi, spotted gum, large-leaved spotted gum (Eucalyptus henryi)
See http://saveourwaterwaysnow.com.au/01_cms/details_pop.asp?ID=137 
Corymbia maculata, spotted gum (Eucalyptus maculata)
 See https://web.archive.org/web/20080508223327/http://asgap.org.au/c-mac.html
 See https://web.archive.org/web/20060517044451/http://www.anu.edu.au/BoZo/KioloaEcyclopaedia/viridiplantae/Spotted%20Gum.htm
Corymbia tessellaris, Moreton Bay ash, carbeen (syn. Eucalyptus tessellaris)
See http://www.saveourwaterwaysnow.com.au/01_cms/details_pop.asp?ID=138 
Cupaniopsis
Cupaniopsis anacardioides, tuckeroo, large-leaved tuckeroo

D
Davallia
Davallia pyxidata, haresfoot fern
Dendrobium, orchids
Dendrobium speciosum, king orchid
Dendrobium macropus
Dendrobium linguiforme, tongue orchid
Dendrobium monophyllum, lily of the valley orchid
Dendrobium teretifolium, bridal veil orchid
Dendrocnide
Dendrocnide photinophylla shiny-leaved stinging tree
See https://web.archive.org/web/20060822090445/http://www.brisrain.webcentral.com.au/old_site/database/Dendro_photinophylla.htm
Denhamia
Denhamia pittosporoides, veiny denhamia
Dianella
Dianella caerulea, blue flax lily, paroo lily
See https://web.archive.org/web/20060822075804/http://www.lhccrems.nsw.gov.au/CPR/CPR/plant_profiles/d.caerulea.htm
Dianella congesta,  dwarf flax-lily
Diploglottis
Diploglottis australis, native tamarind
https://web.archive.org/web/20060822092008/http://www.brisrain.webcentral.com.au/old_site/database/Diplo_australis.htm
Doodia
Doodia aspera, prickly rasp fern
See https://web.archive.org/web/20060822104654/http://www.brisrain.webcentral.com.au/old_site/database/Doodia_aspera.htm
See http://www.saveourwaterwaysnow.com.au/01_cms/details_pop.asp?ID=154 
Drynaria
Drynaria rigidula, basket fern
Dysoxylum
Dysoxylum rufum, hairy rosewood

E
Ehretia
Ehretia acuminata, koda
See https://web.archive.org/web/20060822095556/http://www.brisrain.webcentral.com.au/old_site/database/Ehretia_acuminata.htm
Elaeocarpus, quandong
Elaeocarpus obovatus, hard quandong
 See https://web.archive.org/web/20060822080433/http://www.brisrain.webcentral.com.au/old_site/database/Elaeo_obovatus.htm
Elaeocarpus reticulatus, blueberry ash
 See https://web.archive.org/web/20060822084117/http://www.brisrain.webcentral.com.au/old_site/database/Elaeo_reticulatus.htm
Elattostachys
Elattostachys xylocarpa, white tamarind
Erythina
Erythrina vespertilio, bat's wing coral tree

Eucalyptus, gums, iron barks
Eucalyptus crebra, narrow-leaved ironbark
Eucalyptus henryi, broad-leaved spotted gum
Eucalyptus melanophloia, silver-leaved ironbark
Eucalyptus microcorys, tallowwood
Eucalyptus nigra, Queensland white stringybark
Eucalyptus propinqua, grey gum
See http://www.saveourwaterwaysnow.com.au/01_cms/details_pop.asp?ID=163 
Eucalyptus siderophlia, grey ironbark
See http://www.saveourwaterwaysnow.com.au/01_cms/details_pop.asp?ID=164 
Eucalyptus tereticornis, Queensland blue gum, forest red gum
 See http://www.saveourwaterwaysnow.com.au/01_cms/details_pop.asp?ID=165 
Euroschinus
Euroschinus falcata, ribbonwood

F

Ficus, figs
Ficus coronata, creek sandpaper fig
Ficus fraseri, shiny sandpaper fig
Ficus macrophylla, Moreton Bay fig
Ficus obliqua, small-leaved fig
Ficus opposita, sandpaper fig
Ficus platypoda, rock fig
Ficus virens var. sublanceolata, white fig
Flindersia, ash
Flindersia australis, Crow's ash
Flindersia bennettiana, Bennett's ash

G
Glochidion
Glochidion ferdinandi, cheese tree
Gmelina
Gmelina leichhardtii, white beech

Grevillea
Grevillea robusta, silky oak
Guioa
Guioa semiglauca
Gymnostachys
Gymnostachys anceps, settlers flax

H
Hakea
Hakea florulenta, blooming hakea
 See  
Harpullia
Harpullia pendula, tulipwood
 See https://web.archive.org/web/20060822084730/http://www.brisrain.webcentral.com.au/old_site/database/Harp_pendula.htm
Harpullia hillii, Hill's tulipwood
Hibiscus
Hibiscus heterophyllus, native hibiscus
Hovea
Hovea acutifolia, pointed-leaved hovea
Hymenosporum
Hymenosporum flavum, native frangipani

I

J
Jagera
Jagera pseudorhus, foambark
 See https://web.archive.org/web/20060819081635/http://www.brisrain.webcentral.com.au/01_cms/details_pop.asp?ID=247
Jasminum
Jasminum simplicifolium subsp. australiense
 See https://web.archive.org/web/20060819090235/http://www.brisrain.webcentral.com.au/01_cms/details_pop.asp?ID=245

K

L
Lobelia
Lobelia trigonocaulis, forest lobelia
Lomandra
Lomandra longifolia, long-leaved matrush
Lomandra confertifolia
Lomandra hystrix

Leptospermum, tea trees
Lophostemon, boxes
Lophostemon confertus, brush box, Queensland box, Brisbane box
 See https://web.archive.org/web/20060819082113/http://www.brisrain.webcentral.com.au/01_cms/details_pop.asp?ID=59

M

Macaranga
Macaranga tanarius
Macrozamia, burrawang
Macrozamia lucida, burrawang, pineapple zamia
Macrozamia miquellii

Melaleuca, paperbarks
Mallotus
Mallotus philippensis, red kamala
Mallotus claoxyloides, green kamala
Mallotus discolor, yellow kamala
Melia
Melia azedarach var. australasica, white cedar, Chinaberry
Melicope
Melicope micrococca, white euodia
Microcitrus see citrus

N
Notelaea
Notelaea longifolia, large mock-olive

O
Omalanthus
Omalanthus populifolius, bleeding heart
Oplismenus
Oplismenus aemulus, creeping beard grass
Ottochloa
Ottochloa gracillima, graceful grass 
Owenia
Owenia venosa, crow's apple

P
Pandorea
Pandorea floribunda
Pandorea jasminoides, bower-of-beauty
Pandorea pandorana, wonga vine
Pararchidendron
Pararchidendron pruinosum, monkey's ear-rings
Pavetta
Pavetta australiensis
Pittosporum
Pittosporum rhombifolium, hollywood
Pittosporum revolutum, Brisbane laurel
Planchonella
Planchonella cotinifolia, coondoo
Planchonella pohlmaniana, engraver's wood
Planchonella myrsinoides, yellow plumwood
Platycerium
Platycerium bifurcatum, elkhorn
Platycerium superbum, staghon
Podocarpus, conifers, pines
Podocarpus elatus, brown pine
Polyscias
Polyscias elegans, celerywood
Premna
Premna lignumvitae
Psychotria
Psychotria daphnoides, smooth psychotria
Pteris
Pteridium esculentum, common bracken
Pteris tremula, tender bracken
Pultenaea
Pultenaea cunninghamii, grey bush pea
Pultenaea villosa, hairy bush pea
Pyrrosia
Pyrrosia confluens, felt fern

Q

R
Rhodosphaera
Rhodosphaera rhodanthema, deep yellowwood

S
Smilax
Smilax australis, barbed wire vine
Stenocarpus
Stenocarpus sinuatus, firewheel tree
Stephania
Stephania philippensis, snake vine
Sterculia
Sterculia quadrifida, peanut tree
Streblus
Streblus brunonianus, whalebone tree
Syzygium
Syzygium australe, creek lilly pilly

T
Tabernaemontana
Tabernaemontana pandacaqui, banana bush (Ervatamia angustissepala)
Toechima
Toechima tenax, pitted-leaf steelwood
Toona
Toona australis, red cedar
Trema
Trema aspera, poison peach
Tristaniopsis
Tristaniopsis laurina, watergum
Turraea
Turraea pubescens

U

V

W
Waterhousea
Waterhousea floribunda, weeping lilly pilly (Syzygium floribundum)
Wilkiea
Wilkiea macrophylla, large-leaved wilkiea

Places
Parklands, forests and reserves with native vegetation around Brisbane.

Metropolitan area
Anstead Bushland Reserve
Banks Street Reserve
Bayside Parklands
Belmont Hills Bushland
Boondall Wetlands
Bunyaville State Forest Park
 See https://web.archive.org/web/20070917020029/http://www.epa.qld.gov.au/projects/park/index.cgi?parkid=33
Brisbane Botanic Gardens, Mount Coot-tha
Brisbane Forest Park, Queensland
Brisbane Koala Bushlands
Bulimba Creek
City Botanic Gardens
Chermside Hills Reserves
Deagon Wetlands
Hemmant Quarry Reserve
Indooroopilly Island Conservation Park
Karawatha Forest
Mt Coot-tha Forest
Rafting Ground Reserve
See https://web.archive.org/web/20060822111124/http://www.brisrain.webcentral.com.au/old_site/newsletters/issue5/projects-rrr.html
Raven Street Reserve
Roma Street Parkland
Samford State Forest Park
Seven Hills Bushland Reserve
Tinchi Tamba Wetlands
Toohey Mountain / Toohey Forest
Whites Hill Reserve
Venman Bushland National Park

Within 100 km
Bellthorpe State Forest
Bribie Island
Burleigh Head National Park
Glasshouse Mountains
Moreton Island National Park
Mt Mee State Forest
Nerang State Forest
North Stradbroke Island
Numinbah State Forest
Tamborine Mountain
White Rock Conservation Park

See also

Association of Societies for Growing Australian Plants
Flora of Australia
Invasive species in Australia#Invasive plant species
List of endangered Australian plants
Protected areas of Queensland

References

Plant Reference Materials
Australian Plant Name Index (APNI); Australian National Botanic Gardens; Australian National Herbarium
Brisbane Rainforest Action & Information Network
"Eucalyptus Forest Guide"; P.A.R. Young, P.J. Hauser; Brisbane Forest Park Administration Authority, 1988; 
"Field guide to Eucalypts Volume 3 Northern Australia"; Brooker, Kleinig; Inkata Press, 1994; 
"An Introduction to the Eucalypts" (including Corymbia and Angophora); Andrew Lyne; Centre for Plant Biodiversity Research;
"Key to Eucalypts of Greater Brisbane"; Queensland Herbarium with Queensland Government Environmental Protection Agency, August 2001
"Key to the Wattles of Greater Brisbane"; Queensland Herbarium with Queensland Government Environmental Protection Agency
"Mangroves to Mountains - a field guide to the Native Plants of the Logan-Albert River Catchment"; Logan River branch SGAP. (Qld Region) Inc, 2002; 
"Mangroves to Mountains Volume 2 - a field guide to the Native Plants of South-east Queensland"; Logan River branch SGAP (Qld Region) Inc, 2005; 
"Putting back the forest - a landcare guide for Brookfield, Pullenvale and Moggill"; Bryan Hacker, Rona Butler and Rae Rekdahl; Rural Environment Planning Association Inc, 1994; 
"Rainforest Guide"; P.A.R. Young, P.J. Hauser, L.G.H. Hepworth, K Plowman; Brisbane Forest Park Administration Authority, 1991; 
"Tree ID made Easy - a simple guide to open-forest trees of South-East Queensland"; Ann Moran; Published by the author; 
"Wild plants of greater Brisbane - a Queensland Museum Guide"; Queensland Museum, 2003; 

Places Reference Materials
Brisbane's Natural Areas
EPA's list of parks and forests around Brisbane
List of parks in Brisbane
Mountains to Mangroves Organisation
"Wild places of greater Brisbane - a Queensland Museum Publication"; Queensland Museum, 1996;

External links
A short essay about the eucalyptus - corymbia reclassification debate

Revegetation and planting resources
Bulimba Creek Catchment Coordinating Committee (B4C)
Greening Australia
Greening Australia Nursery
Save our Waterways Now (SOWN) 

Flora of Queensland
Brisbane